Andrea Giovannini (born 27 August 1993) is an Italian speed skater.

Giovannini competed at the 2014 Winter Olympics for Italy. He competed in the 5000 metres, where he finished 17th.

As of September 2014, Giovannini's best performance at the World Allround Championships is 17th, in 2014. He also won three medals at the 2013 World Junior Championships, including gold in the team pursuit.

Giovannini made his World Cup debut in March 2013. As of December 2014, Giovannini has one World Cup victory, in a mass start race in 2014–15. His best overall finish in the World Cup is 8th, in the 2013–14 mass start cup.

Personal records

He is currently in 17th position in the adelskalender.

References

External links

1993 births
Italian male speed skaters
Speed skaters at the 2014 Winter Olympics
Speed skaters at the 2018 Winter Olympics
Speed skaters at the 2022 Winter Olympics
Olympic speed skaters of Italy
Sportspeople from Trento
Living people
Competitors at the 2013 Winter Universiade
Universiade bronze medalists for Italy
Universiade medalists in speed skating
World Single Distances Speed Skating Championships medalists